Panama competed at the 1976 Summer Olympics in Montreal, Canada.

Results by event

Athletics
Guy Abrahams

Judo
Jorge Comrie

Swimming
Carlos González
Georgina Osorio
Gianni Versari

Weightlifting
Narcisco Orán
Pablo Justiniani

Wrestling
Segundo Olmedo

References
Official Olympic Reports
sports-reference

Nations at the 1976 Summer Olympics
1976 Summer Olympics
1976 in Panamanian sport